The National Elections Commission (NEC) of the Republic of Liberia is an autonomous agency in Liberia that supervises the national elections of Liberia.

Staff 
The following people are members of the Commission of 2013
Chairman: Jerome G. Korkoya
Co-Chairman: Sarah J. Toe
Commissioners:
Jonathan K. Weedor
Samuel Z. Joe
Jeanette A. Ebba-Davidson
Davidetta Browne Lansanah
Boakai Dukuly
Executive-Director
C.A. Lamin Lighe
Deputy Executive-Directors
Dweh Doeyen
Emma K. Togbah
Nathan P. Garbie

International aid 
In 2009, a $17.5 million contract was offered to the NEC by USAID through the International Foundation for Electoral Systems. The money was provided to support the Commission in holding the 2011 and 2014 general elections. The aid was greeted by then election commissioner, James Fromayan.

References

External links 
 

Liberia
Elections in Liberia
Government of Liberia
1986 establishments in Liberia